An election to Wicklow County Council took place on 24 May 2019 as part of the Irish local elections. 32 councillors were elected from six local electoral areas (LEAs) on the system of proportional representation by means of the single transferable vote (PR-STV) for a five-year term of office.

In 2014, there were five LEAs each electing between 6 and 8 councillors. Following the recommendations of the Local Area Boundary Committee Report in June 2018, there are now six LEAs each electing between 4 and 6 councillors. The changes were enacted by statutory instrument (S.I.) No. 638/2018.

Fine Gael increased their seat numbers by 1 to emerge with 9 seats while Fianna Fáil retained 7 seats overall. Fianna Fáil again won 3 seats in Arklow but did secure 2 seats in Baltinglass. However they emerged seatless in both LEAs in Bray. Sinn Féin had a very disappointing election losing 4 seats to emerge 2 seats overall both in Bray the base of the TD John Brady. Several party Councillors had quit since 2014 and Gerry O'Neill and John Snell were both re-elected as Independents. The Greens gained an additional seat to return with 2 seats. Labour returned to the council with 2 seats in Bray and Wicklow while Jennifer Whitmore won a seat for the Social Democrats in Greystones. While there were a lot of changes Independent numbers reduced by just 1 seat to 9.

Results by party

Retiring incumbents
The following members of Wicklow County Council announced in advance of the poll that they would not be seeking re-election:

Results by local electoral area

Arklow

Baltinglass

Bray East

Bray West

Greystones

Wicklow

Results by gender

Changes since 2019 local elections
†Bray East Green Party Cllr Steven Matthews was elected to the Dáil in the 2020 general election as a Teachta Dála (TD) for the Wicklow constituency. His wife, Erika Doyle, was co-opted to fill the vacancy on 25 February 2020.
††Greystones Social Democrats Cllr Jennifer Whitmore was elected to the Dáil in the 2020 general election as a Teachta Dála (TD) for the Wicklow constituency. Jodie Neary was co-opted to fill the vacancy on 25 February 2020.
†††Greystones Independent Cllr Mags Crean resigned from her position in May 2022. Former Greystones mayor Stephen Stokes was co-opted to fill the vacancy on 14 June 2022.

Sources

References 

2019 Irish local elections
2019